The Nizam Diamond, also known as the "little Koh-i-noor", was a famous diamond in the 1800s. Its whereabouts today are unknown. It was named after its original owner Mir Osman Ali Khan, the last Nizam of Hyderabad.

Richard Francis Burton described it in an 1876 article:The stone is said to be of the finest water. An outline of the model gives a maximum length of 1 inch 10'25 lines, and 1 inch 2 lines for the greatest breadth, with conformabe thickness throughout. The face is slightly convex, and the cleavage plane produced by the fracture is nearly flat, with a curious slope or groove beginning at the apex. The general appearance is an imperfect oval, with only one projection which will require the saw: it will easily cut into a splendid brilliant, larger and more valuable than the present Koh-i-núr. [The Koh-i-noor diamond was cut down from 191 modern carats (38.2 g) to 105.6 carats (21.1 g) in 1852.]The stone went missing shortly after the 1948 Annexation of Hyderabad.

See also
 List of diamonds

External links

Captain Richard Burton

Notes

Hyderabad State
Individual diamonds
Jewels of the Nizams of Hyderabad
Golconda diamonds